"You Be Illin' " is the third single released by Run–D.M.C. from their third album, Raising Hell. It was released in 1986 through Profile Records as the follow-up to the rap rock crossover hit, "Walk This Way", and was produced by Run-D.M.C.

Background
The slang term illing means to "be uncool and unrelaxed", "be acting crazy", "be 'tripping' or 'bugging' ", or "be acting 'wack' ". The song describes some examples of "illing" and chides a fictitious individual for his "illing" behavior. Such examples include a man ordering a Big Mac and french fries at a Kentucky Fried Chicken restaurant, calling out "Touchdown!" at a basketball game, repelling a woman at a party with  drunken behavior and bad breath, and being oblivious to the fact he is eating dog food for dinner.

Reception
Cash Box called it "a humorous poke at social faux pas and has the earmarks of becoming a huge novelty hit."

Track listing

A-side
"You Be Illin' " – 3:26

B-side
"Hit It Run" – 3:10

Charts
The song peaked at number 29 on the Billboard Hot 100 and number 12 on the Hot Black Singles chart.

Cover versions
In 2012, The Carolina Chocolate Drops covered "You Be Illin' " on a bonus track of their album, Leaving Eden.

References

1986 singles
Run-DMC songs
Song recordings produced by Rick Rubin
Songs written by Darryl McDaniels
Songs written by Joseph Simmons
1986 songs
Profile Records singles
Songs written by Jam Master Jay